Saint-Hilaire-lez-Cambrai (literally Saint-Hilaire near Cambrai) is a commune in the Nord department in northern France.

Heraldry

French sartorial heritage 
The city was a pivotal center of mulquinerie

See also
Communes of the Nord department

References

Sainthilairelezcambrai